Baro Kunda is a town in central-southern Gambia. It is located in Jarra East District in the Lower River Division.  As of 2012, it has an estimated population of 2,149.

References

External links
Satellite map at Maplandia

Populated places in the Gambia